Miyi County is a county in the far south of Sichuan Province, China. It is under the administration of Panzhihua city.

Climate

References

 
County-level divisions of Sichuan
Panzhihua